League tables for teams participating in Seiska, the eighth and final tier in the Finnish Soccer League system, in 2009.

2009 League tables

Helsinki

Section 1

Section 2

Section 3

Section Winners play-offs

References and sources
Finnish FA
ResultCode
Seiska (jalkapallo)

Footnotes

8
Seiska seasons